Georgy Shotayevich Gogichayev (born 16 January 1991) is a Russian former professional association football player.

Career
Gogichayev made his professional debut for FC Alania Vladikavkaz on 13 July 2010 in the Russian Cup game against FC KAMAZ Naberezhnye Chelny.

On 30 August 2016, Gogichayev signed with FC Shirak until 31 July 2017. But he left the club before new year 2017.

References

External links
Career summary at sportbox.ru  

1991 births
Sportspeople from Vladikavkaz
Living people
Russian footballers
Russia youth international footballers
FC Spartak Vladikavkaz players
Russian Premier League players
FC Sakhalin Yuzhno-Sakhalinsk players
Armenian Premier League players
FC Shirak players
FC Dacia Chișinău players
Moldovan Super Liga players
Russian expatriate footballers
Expatriate footballers in Armenia
Expatriate footballers in Moldova
Association football forwards